Georges Demulder (12 May 1909 – 6 May 1983) was a Belgian footballer. He played in one match for the Belgium national football team in 1939.

References

External links
 

1909 births
1983 deaths
Belgian footballers
Belgium international footballers
Place of birth missing
Association football forwards